Howard Mildren was an Australian lawn bowls international who competed in the 1938 British Empire Games.

Bowls career
At the 1938 British Empire Games he won the silver medal in the pairs event with Percy Hutton.

He was the 1938 Australian National Bowls Championships pairs winner when bowling with Hutton for the South Park Bowls Club in South Australia and was State champion in 1934 and 1951, the latter when representing the Adelaide Bowls Club.

References

Australian male bowls players
Bowls players at the 1938 British Empire Games
Commonwealth Games silver medallists for Australia
Commonwealth Games medallists in lawn bowls
Medallists at the 1938 British Empire Games